Joseph Harvey Ladew Sr. (April 10, 1865 – February 16, 1940) was one of the largest leather manufacturers in the world with Fayerweather & Ladew, and he was a yachtsman.

Biography
He was born on April 10, 1865, to Rebecca Krom (?-1905) and Harvey Smith Ladew I (?-1888) in Shokan, New York. He attended Columbia School of Mines in 1885 and left the program to join the family run Fayerweather & Ladew in Glen Cove, New York. The company was started by his brother, Edward R. Ladew in 1898. He became a partner in the company on February 1, 1889.

On November 27, 1901, he married Jennie Bennett House. They had two children: Joseph Harvey Ladew Jr. (1905-?) and Oliver Ladew (1906-1979). Ladew died on February 16, 1940, at LeRoy Sanitarium in Manhattan.

Yachts
He had two yachts, both named Columbia built, the first built by Cramp Shipbuilding launched from Philadelphia on August 23, 1893. In 1909 the ship began a nine year long loan to the New York Naval Militia. The yacht was brought back into active naval service 7 April 1917 for World War I service and continued in naval service until decommissioned at Norfolk on 1 December 1919.

In 1898 he ordered a new yacht from the Crescent Shipyard in Elizabethport, New Jersey, for $200,000. The second Columbia, constructed in 1899 and delivered 1900, was designed for possible conversion to a naval auxiliary and modeled after the United States Coast Survey steamer Pathfinder that had been built in the same shipyard. In 1913 it was briefly impounded by the Japanese at Wakayama.

Notes

1867 births
1940 deaths
Leathermaking
Columbia School of Mines alumni
Ladew family